Edge of Reality, Ltd. was an American video game developer founded in 1998 and based in Austin, Texas that developed video games for the Nintendo 64, GameCube, PlayStation 2 and Xbox game consoles. It also had games in development for PlayStation 3 and Xbox 360 games consoles. It was best-known for developing Nintendo 64 ports of the first three Tony Hawk's games.

The company had two development teams, one of which worked on licenses and established franchises while the other worked on completely original games.  The company only developed two games at a time, one with each studio, feeling that "anything more than that would jeopardize our focus, and therefore the quality of our studio".

History
Edge of Reality was founded in 1998 by Rob Cohen, the lead programmer of Turok: Dinosaur Hunter at Iguana Entertainment and Mike Panoff from Paradigm Entertainment. The company started by developing Nintendo 64 ports of successful games on other systems, including the Tony Hawk's Pro Skater series. Following the stability provided by the success of the ports, the company then branched out into developing its own original games on multiple platforms, including Pitfall: The Lost Expedition and Loadout.

Games developed

Ports

References

External links
 Official website

Video game development companies
Video game companies established in 1998
Video game companies disestablished in 2017
Privately held companies based in Texas
Companies based in Austin, Texas
1998 establishments in Texas
2017 disestablishments in Texas
Defunct video game companies of the United States
Video game companies based in Texas
Defunct companies based in Texas

Side note they abused power and got shutdown im so happy on that one.